L'houcine "Aussie" Ouzgni (born 10 March 1983) is a Dutch-Moroccan Light Heavyweight/Middleweight Muay Thai kickboxer fighting out of Amsterdam, Netherlands for Top Team Beverwijk.  Aussie is a firm fan favorite in the Netherlands due to his exciting style and knockout power, likened to a smaller version of fellow Moroccan fighter Badr Hari.  He is a three time Dutch national Muay Thai champion, currently competing within the It's Showtime organization.

Biography/Career

Aussie began his career fighting on the local circuit in the Netherlands at C-Klass and B-Klass level, winning almost all his fights.  He won his first title in 2005, winning a B-Klass eight-man tournament at a gala in Purmerend to honor the recently deceased Moroccan-Dutchboxer Nordin Ben-Salah who was shot dead in Amsterdam.  Aussie stopped his first two opponents before defeating Peter Mes in the final via decision.  He also headed to Morocco where he took part in the W.A.K.O. world championships, receiving a bronze medal in the Thai-Boxing middleweight division.  In 2006 Aussie made his debut with the It's Showtime organization against Junior Gonsalves, sharing the spoils in a five round decision draw at the event in Alkmaar.  He returned to the organization the following year to take part in a qualifying tournament for the It's Showtime's 75MAX Trophy, defeating Henry Akdeniz in the quarter finals by decision but was unable to proceed due to an injury suffered during his victory.

In 2008 Aussie won his first major honor (at A-Klass level) against Melvin van Leeuwarden picking up the I.R.O. Dutch title.  He added another belt the following year, beating the seasoned Imro Main by technical knockout to add the U.M.C. Dutch title to his repertoire.  With title wins making him noticed on the Dutch circuit, Aussie continued his progress beating good pros such as Amir Zeyada, Ali Gunyar and It’s Showtime Reality winner Sem Braan.  He then demolished in form Nieky Holzken in less than a minute to emerge as a major player on the It's Showtime circuit, earning himself a title shot for the organizations vacant 77MAX world title at the end of 2010.

At the Fightclub presents: It's Showtime 2010 he faced the highly decorated Russian Artem Levin, who had recently beat Yodsaenklai Fairtex to win gold at the 2010 World Combat Games.  The title fight was a fairly even affair, with Aussie well in it until the fourth round, when a toe from an Artem kick injured Aussie his eye, leaving him unable to continue.  In March 2011 Aussie met two-time K-1 MAX and three time S-Cup world champion Andy Souwer, dropping down in weight to fight at 70 kg.  Perhaps drained from the weight cut, he was not his normal explosive self and was outclassed by Souwer who took a unanimous points decision victory.

He will fight Mike de Snoo in Beverwijk, Netherlands on October 21, 2012, but by injury Mike de Snoo was replaced by Douli Chen who only fought 2 fights in the A-Classe. Duoli Chen lost respectively against the experienced Moroccan Aussie with points. .

He lost to Marc de Bonte by KO from a knee in round one at Glory 6: Istanbul in Istanbul, Turkey on April 6, 2013.

His release from Glory was reported in February 2014, having gone 0-1 in the promotion.

Titles

Professional
2012 It's Showtime 73 kg MAX World Champion
2009 U.M.C. Super Middleweight Dutch title -76.2 kg 
2008 I.R.O. Super Middleweight Dutch title -76.2 kg
2005 Muaythai Gala Purmerend B-Klass tournament -76 kg

Amateur
2005 W.A.K.O. World Championships in Agadir, Morocco  -75 kg (Thai-Boxing)

Kickboxing Record 

|-  bgcolor="#FFBBBB"
| 2013-04-06 || Loss ||align=left| Marc de Bonte || Glory 6: Istanbul || Istanbul, Turkey || KO (knee) || 1 || 
|-  bgcolor="#CCFFCC"
| 2012-10-21 || Win ||align=left| Duoli Chen || Top Team Beverwijk Gala || Beverwijk, Netherlands || Decision || 3 || 3:00
|-  bgcolor="#CCFFCC"
| 2012-09-02 || Win ||align=left| Nieky Holzken || Muay Thai Mania V || The Hague, Netherlands || Extra R. Decision || 4 || 3:00
|-  bgcolor="#CCFFCC"
| 2012-01-28 || Win ||align=left| Yohan Lidon || It's Showtime 2012 in Leeuwarden || Leeuwarden, Netherlands || Decision || 5 || 3:00
|-
! style=background:white colspan=9 |
|-
|-  bgcolor="#FFBBBB"
| 2011-10-16 || Loss ||align=left| Hicham El Gaoui || Beverwijk Top Team Gala  || Beverwijk, Netherlands || Decision ||  || 
|-
|-  bgcolor="#FFBBBB"
| 2011-03-06 || Loss ||align=left| Andy Souwer || It's Showtime Sporthallen Zuid || Amsterdam, Netherlands || Decision (Unanimous) || 3 || 3:00
|-
|-  bgcolor="#FFBBBB"
| 2010-12-18 || Loss ||align=left| Artem Levin || Fightclub presents: It's Showtime 2010 || Amsterdam, Netherlands || TKO (Eye Injury) || 4 || 2:29 
|-
! style=background:white colspan=9 |
|-
|-  bgcolor="#CCFFCC"
| 2010-10-24 || Win ||align=left| Henry Akdeniz || Top Team Beverwijk Gala || Beverwijk, Netherlands || TKO (Ref Stop/3 Knockdowns) || 4 || 
|-
|-  bgcolor="#CCFFCC"
| 2010-09-12 || Win ||align=left| Nieky Holzken || Fightingstars presents: It's Showtime 2010 || Amsterdam, Netherlands || KO (Left Flying Knee) || 1 || 0:53
|-
|-  bgcolor="#CCFFCC"
| 2010-05-29 || Win ||align=left| Sem Braan || It's Showtime 2010 Amsterdam || Amsterdam, Netherlands || Decision (4-1) || 3 || 3:00
|- 
|-  bgcolor="#CCFFCC"
| 2010-03-21 || Win ||align=left| Khalid Chabrani || K-1 World MAX 2010 West Europe Tournament, Super Fight || Utrecht, Netherlands || Decision || 3 || 3:00 
|-
|-  bgcolor="#CCFFCC"
| 2010-02-27 || Win ||align=left| Ali Gunyar || Fight Club Amsterdam III || Amsterdam, Netherlands || KO (Right Cross) || 2 || 
|-
|-  bgcolor="#CCFFCC"
| 2009-10-25 || Win ||align=left| Amir Zeyada || Top Team Beverwijk Gala || Beverwijk, Netherlands || Decision || 3 || 3:00
|-
|-  bgcolor="#CCFFCC"
| 2009-04-11 || Win ||align=left| Wehaj Kingboxing || Fight Club Amsterdam || Amsterdam, Netherlands || KO (Punches) || 2 || 
|-
|-  bgcolor="#CCFFCC"
| 2009-03-08 || Win ||align=left| Imro Main || Beatdown Amsterdam || Amsterdam, Netherlands || TKO (Corner Stop/Left Uppercut) || 4 || 
|-
! style=background:white colspan=9 |
|-
|-  bgcolor="#FFBBBB"
| 2008-10-26 || Loss ||align=left| Sem Braan || Top Team Gala Beverwijk || Beverwijk, Netherlands || KO (High Kick + Punch) || 5 || 
|-
|-  bgcolor="#CCFFCC"
| 2008-03-30 || Win ||align=left| Melvin van Leeuwarden || Dangerzone V, Zonnehuis || Amsterdam, Netherlands || TKO (Doc Stop/Cut, Flying Knee) || 1 || 
|-
! style=background:white colspan=9 |
|-
|-  bgcolor="#CCFFCC"
| 2008-02-17 || Win ||align=left| Ömer Isitan || K-1 MAX Netherlands 2008, Super Fight || Utrecht, Netherlands || TKO (Knee Injury) || 1 || 
|-
|-  bgcolor="#CCFFCC"
| 2007-02-02 || Win ||align=left| Henry Akdeniz || It's Showtime 75MAX Trophy Zwolle, Quarter Finals || Zwolle, Netherlands || Decision || 3 || 3:00  
|-
! style=background:white colspan=9 |
|-
|-  bgcolor="#c5d2ea"
| 2006-12-03 || Draw ||align=left| Junior Gonsalves || It's Showtime 2006 Alkmaar || Alkmaar, Netherlands || Decision Draw || 5 || 3:00
|-
|-  bgcolor="#CCFFCC"
| 2006-10-15 || Win ||align=left| Jeremi Blijd || Top Team Beverwijk Muaythai Gala || Beverwijk, Netherlands || Decision (Unanimous) || 3 || 3:00
|-
|-  bgcolor="#CCFFCC"
| 2006-05-20 || Win ||align=left| Edie Benton || 	Muaythai Gala "Fighting Nordin Memorial II" || Purmerend, Netherlands || KO ||  ||
|-
|-  bgcolor="#CCFFCC" 
| 2005-11-05 || Win ||align=left| Kevin de Bougne || Thaibox Gala in Breda || Breda, Netherlands || Decision || 5 || 2:00 
|-
|-  bgcolor="#CCFFCC"
| 2006-01-28 || Win ||align=left| Panayotis Tsirimokos || Fight Club, Wellness Profi Center || Purmerend, Netherlands || TKO || ||
|-
|-  bgcolor="#CCFFCC"
| 2005-06-18 || Win ||align=left| Mesut Derin || Showdome IV, Amsterdam Velodrome || Amsterdam, Netherlands || Decision (Unanimous) || 5 || 2:00
|-
|-  bgcolor="#CCFFCC"
| 2005-05-21 || Win ||align=left| Peter Mes || Muaythai Gala Purmerend, B-Klass Final || Purmerend, Netherlands || Decision || 3 || 2:00
|-
! style=background:white colspan=9 |
|-
|-  bgcolor="#CCFFCC"
| 2005-05-21 || Win ||align=left| Khalid Chabrani || Muaythai Gala Purmerend, B-Klass Semi Finals || Purmerend, Netherlands || KO || 1 || 
|-
|-  bgcolor="#CCFFCC"
| 2005-05-21 || Win ||align=left| Mohammed Aouragh || Muaythai Gala Purmerend, B-Klass Quarter Finals || Purmerend, Netherlands || TKO (Corner Stop) || 1 ||
|-
|-  bgcolor="#CCFFCC"
| 2005-02-13 || Win ||align=left| Matias Ipssa || Gala gala Hoornse Vaart || Alkmaar, Netherlands || Decision || 5 || 2:00
|-
|-  bgcolor="#CCFFCC"
| 2004-05-29 || Win ||align=left| Petr Kuchar || Gym Alkmaar Gala, Sporthal de Myse || Schermerhorn, Netherlands || TKO || 3 || 
|-
|-  bgcolor="#FFBBBB"
| 2004-03-14 || Loss ||align=left| Cedric Bacuna || Killer Dome V, Bijlmer Sportcentrum || Amsterdam, Netherlands || TKO (Ref Stop) || 3 ||
|-
|-  bgcolor="#CCFFCC"
| 2004-01-25 || Win ||align=left| Abdul Selam || Thaiboxing & Freefight event in Alkmaar || Alkmaar, Netherlands || Decision || 5 || 2:00
|-
|-  bgcolor="#CCFFCC"
| 2003-11-30 || Win ||align=left| Jermain Welles || Killer Dome IV, Bijlmer Sportcentrum || Amsterdam, Netherlands || TKO (Corner Stop) || 4 || 
|-
|-  bgcolor="#CCFFCC"
| 2003-02-15 || Win ||align=left| Jermain Welles || Xena Sport Victory or Hell 8 || Amsterdam, Netherlands || Decision || 3 || 3:00
|-
|-  bgcolor="#CCFFCC"
| 2003-01-26 || Win ||align=left| Petr Kuchar || Gala in Schremerhorn || Schermerhorn, Netherlands || TKO || 2 ||
|-
|-  bgcolor="#FFBBBB"
| 2002-10-02 || Loss ||align=left| Wesley Romijn || Muaythai Gala, Zonnehuis || Amsterdam, Netherlands || Disqualification || 1 || 
|-
|-  bgcolor="#CCFFCC"
| 2002-04-27 || Win ||align=left| Benjamin || Gym Alkmaar Gala, Sporthal de Myse || Schermerhorn, Netherlands || Decision (Unanimous) || 3 || 2:00
|-
|-
| colspan=9 | Legend:

References

External links
 L'houcine "Aussie" Ouzgni-The Aussie Fan Page - Athlete | Facebook

1984 births
Living people
Dutch male kickboxers
Moroccan male kickboxers
Light heavyweight kickboxers
Middleweight kickboxers
Dutch Muay Thai practitioners
Moroccan Muay Thai practitioners
Dutch sportspeople of Moroccan descent
Place of birth missing (living people)